The 1999 STAR CHOICE World Junior Curling Championships were held at Z-Hallen in Östersund, Sweden March 20–28.

Men's

Teams

Round-robin standings

Round robin scores

Draw 1

Draw 2

Draw 3

Draw 4

Draw 5

Draw 6

Draw 7

Draw 8

Draw 9

7th place tiebreaker

Playoffs

Semifinals

Bronze medal game

Gold medal game

Women's

Teams

Round-robin standings

Round robin scores

Draw 1

Draw 2

Draw 3

Draw 4

Draw 5

Draw 6

Draw 7

Draw 8

Draw 9

Playoffs

Semifinals

Bronze medal game

Gold medal game

References

Sources

J
World Junior Curling Championships
International curling competitions hosted by Sweden
1999 in Swedish sport
Sports competitions in Östersund
March 1999 sports events in Europe
1999 in youth sport